Beech Hill may refer to the following places:

Beech Hill, Berkshire, England
Beech Hill (Dublin, New Hampshire)
Beech Hill (Delaware County, New York), an elevation
Beech Hill (Herkimer County, New York), an elevation
Beech Hill, Nova Scotia, Canada
Beech Hill, Georgia, a ghost town
Beech Hill, Tennessee (disambiguation), United States
Beech Hill, West Virginia, United States
Beech Hill (Victoria), a small mountain in West Gippsland, Victoria, Australia